Pepperell may refer to:

People
Albert Pepperell (1922–1986), rugby league footballer
Derek Pepperell (born 1968), English cricketer
East Bay Ray (born Raymond John Pepperell, born 1958), punk guitarist
Eddie Pepperell (born 1991), English golfer
Russell Pepperell (1918–2003), rugby league footballer
Stan Pepperell (1914–1985), rugby league footballer
William Pepperrell (1696–1759), merchant and soldier in Colonial Massachusetts
William Pepperell Montague (1873–1953), philosopher

Places
In Canada:
Pepperrell Air Force Base, a decommissioned U.S. military base located in St. John's, Newfoundland

In the United States:
Pepperell, Massachusetts, a New England town
Pepperell (CDP), Massachusetts, the central village in the town
Pepperell Center Historic District
East Pepperell, Massachusetts

See also
Pepperrell (disambiguation)